Bembidion yukonum is a species of ground beetle in the subfamily Trechinae. It is found in Finland, Norway, Russia, Sweden, Canada and the U.S. state of Alaska. Its habitat includes cracks, river banks and clayish soils. It feeds on birch trees.

References

Further reading

 
 
 

yukonum
Beetles described in 1926
Beetles of North America